Charles Bulkeley (by 1493–1549/1550), was an English politician.

He was a Member (MP) of the Parliament of England for Salisbury in 1542.

References

15th-century births
1550 deaths
English MPs 1542–1544